Almost Friends is a 2016 American comedy-drama film written and directed by Jake Goldberger. The film stars Freddie Highmore, Odeya Rush, Haley Joel Osment, Christopher Meloni, and Marg Helgenberger.

The film premiered on October 14, 2016 at the Austin Film Festival. It was released in North America on November 17, 2017, by Gravitas Ventures and Orion Pictures.

Plot
Charlie (Freddie Highmore) is an unmotivated man who lives at home with his mother (Marg Helgenberger) and stepfather while working at a small movie theatre and living vicariously through his best friend, Ben (Haley Joel Osment). His life takes an unpredictable turn however, when he finds himself falling for local barista Amber (Odeya Rush). Problem is, Amber has her own distractions: her mooching roommate (Jake Abel), a track star boyfriend (Taylor John Smith) and steadfast plans to move to New York City. On top of that, Charlie's estranged father (Christopher Meloni) unexpectedly re-enters his life just as he begins to take a long, hard look at where he's going and who he wants to be. With conflict after conflict piling on, will Charlie reach his tipping point or will he finally find the path forward?

Cast
 Freddie Highmore as Charlie Brenner
 Odeya Rush as Amber
 Haley Joel Osment as Ben
 Christopher Meloni as Howard
 Marg Helgenberger as Samantha
 Rita Volk as Heather
 Jake Abel as Jack
 Taylor John Smith as Brad
 Lonnie Knight as Homeless Man
 Gary Ray Moore as Ross
 Jon Hayden as Russel

Production
On August 18, 2015, it was announced that the production on comedy-drama film Holding Patterns was underway, starring Freddie Highmore, Odeya Rush, Haley Joel Osment, Rita Volk, Jake Abel, and Taylor John Smith. Jake Goldberger was directing the film from his own screenplay, while Alex Ginzburg and Tony Lee would be producing the film through Let It Play, with Jim Young producing through Animus Films. On August 26, 2015, Christopher Meloni and Marg Helgenberger joined the film's cast to play Howard and Samantha, respectively, and Gary Ray Moore also joined the cast.

Principal photography began in Mobile, Alabama on July 27, 2015. Highmore and Volk were spotted shooting on location at Spanish Fort High School the following day.

Release
In October 2017, Gravitas Ventures and Orion Pictures acquired distribution rights to the film, and set it for a November 17, 2017, release.

Reception

Box office
Almost Friends has grossed a total worldwide of $46,376, and sales of its DVD/Blu-ray releases have cashed $16,355.

Critical response

In a positive review, Marjorie Baumgarten of the Austin Chronicle wrote, "[The film] has an easygoing charm that should earn it a solid place among the subset of movies about young people who emerge from their small-town cocoons and screw up their courage to take flight for the bright lights of New York City." Sheri Linden of The Hollywood Reporter described it less favorably as "a comic drama that's sometimes appealingly gentle but more often frustratingly amorphous" with "instances of wit and sensitivity scattered through the screenplay, but they have no cumulative impact amid the lackluster direction and general dearth of urgency." Upon the film's theatrical release, Katie Walsh of the Los Angeles Times called the film's premise of Highmore's character, Charlie, tenuously pursuing a relationship with Rush's Amber despite her existing relationship, "painfully tone-deaf" in light of the onset of Me Too movement, suggesting it "feels like a relic of a bygone era, when movies could casually present stalking and coercion as acceptable forms of courtship."

References

External links
 
 
 
 

2016 films
American comedy-drama films
2016 comedy-drama films
Films shot in Mobile, Alabama
Orion Pictures films
2010s English-language films
2010s American films